St. Catharines Propulsion Plant, is a General Motors Canada engine and manual transmission   factory in St. Catharines, Ontario. Opened in 1954 and located on Glendale Avenue. The plant is also called "St. Catharines Powertrain - Glendale Avenue Plant". The factory supports production of cast engine blocks from Defiance Foundry in Defiance, Ohio and Saginaw Metal Casting Operations in Saginaw, Michigan.

Starting in 2012, it also produces GM's new six-speed transmissions.

Products

Engines 
 Vortec 
 4.8L 
 5.3L
 V8 Gen IV 4.8L, 5.3L, 6.0L, 6.2L, 7.0L 
 HFV6 engines 3.6L, 2.8L 
 6.2L
 Blocks

Other 
 Manual transmissions GF6, C8 Dual Clutch

See also
 List of GM engines

References

External links
 

General Motors factories
Buildings and structures in St. Catharines
1954 establishments in Ontario
Motor vehicle assembly plants in Canada